Friends but Married (stylized as #TemanTapiMenikah) is a 2018 Indonesian drama film produced by .

Plot 
Talking about the friendship between Ayu with Ditto from junior and senior high school to romance colored the sweetness of their lives. But both must undergo a relationship without status. They were close friends, but looked jealous because each had a lover. Although many others who see the cohesiveness of both also think they are dating.

Cast
Adipati Dolken as Ditto
Cole Gribble as young Ditto
 as Ayudia Bing Slamet
Sandrinna Michelle as young Ayu
 Refal Hady as Rifnu
 Denira Wiraguna as Dila
 Shara Virrisya as Ayu's Mother
 Sari Nila as Ditto's Mother
 Rendi Jhon as Damar
 Cut Beby Tshabina as Mila
 Diandra Agatha as Aca
 Sarah Sechan as yourself
 Iqbaal Ramadhan as himself
 Ivan Leonardy sebagai Ditto's Father
 Clay Gribble as Diko
 Atiq Rahman as Abe
 Rival Soebandri as Iqbal
 Ridwan Kamil as himself (lecturer)
 Sanca Khatulistiwa as a ball player 
 Khiva Iskak as a music engineer
 Martina Tesela as floor director
 Royhan Hidayat as Ayu's acting opponent
 Meutia Pudjowarsito as a film director
 Fahmi Agelan as head of village
 Wulan Sohora as a friend of Mila 1
 Indah Alya as a friend of Mila 2
 Andarumayasa as a friend of Mila 3
 Muldani Muwahid as a concert crew

Critical reception 
Writing about the film for The Jakarta Post in a mixed review, Stanley Widianto writes that the film "finds its strength as a romantic comedy by eschewing forced storytelling" that "feels less like a fictional film and more like chapters of a shared diary", praising the script for its "naturalistic and heartwarming" storytelling.

References

External links
 

2018 films
2018 drama films
2010s Indonesian-language films
Indonesian coming-of-age drama films
2010s coming-of-age drama films
Films directed by Rako Prijanto